Adam Craig is an American country music singer-songwriter from Tenino, Washington. In March 2011 he signed to Sony/ATV Music Publishing, and has co-penned songs including Parmalee's "Close Your Eyes", Jason Aldean's "Church Pew or Bar Stool", Dustin Lynch's "World to Me", and Love and Theft's "Whiskey on My Breath". Now signed to Stoney Creek Records, Craig has released his self-titled debut EP, and his debut single to country radio called "Reckon", written by Randy Montana, also off of his self titled EP was "Just a Phase" which climbed into the top 40. Following his self titled EP, Adam released a single called "Why Can't She". This song stayed on radio for just under a year when he finally released the "If You're Lucky" single track. This song was released as a single with "Whatever You're Drinking To" being a song on the record as well. Derek George and Jeremy Stover.

Early life 
Adam Craig grew up in Tenino, Washington, 75 miles south of Seattle. He played baseball throughout high school until learning guitar at the age of 18. After playing one year of college baseball, and touring in a three-piece country band, Adam decided to focus on music, performing with Sara Evans and meeting with a Nashville-based producer. In 2004 Adam moved to Nashville.

Music career 
Soon after his move to Nashville, Craig signed his first publishing deal. He performed at clubs on Broadway, and eventually formed a band under the name TelluRide and later, The Adam Craig Band. The band independently released three singles, charting on the Billboard Indicator Chart. In 2010 Adam had his first song recorded by a major label artist, with "Church Pew or Bar Stool" by Jason Aldean. It was that song and others that landed him signing with Sony/ATV in April 2011, and to the Broken Bow label group in 2014. Craig was credited as one of the country artists to watch in 2017 by Sounds Like Nashville. Craig parted way's with Stoney Creek in October 2019.

Songwriting discography

Discography

Extended plays

Singles

Music videos

References

Year of birth missing (living people)
Living people
Singer-songwriters from Washington (state)
American country singer-songwriters
BBR Music Group artists
Country musicians from Washington (state)
American male singer-songwriters